Ascalabos is an extinct genus of ray-finned fish known from the Late Jurassic Solnhofen Limestone of Germany. It contains one species, A. voithii.

See also
 List of prehistoric bony fish genera

References 

Prehistoric ray-finned fish genera
Late Jurassic bony fish
Late Jurassic fish of Europe
Solnhofen fauna
Fossil taxa described in 1839